Elections to the Baseball Hall of Fame for 1994 followed the system in place since 1978. The Baseball Writers' Association of America (BBWAA) voted by mail to select from recent major league players and 
elected Steve Carlton. The Veterans Committee met in closed sessions to consider older major league players as well as managers, umpires, executives, and figures from the Negro leagues. It selected two, Leo Durocher and Phil Rizzuto. A formal induction ceremony was held in Cooperstown, New York, on July 31, 1994.

BBWAA election
The BBWAA was authorized to elect players active in 1974 or later, but not after 1988; the ballot included candidates from the 1993 ballot who received at least 5% of the vote but were not elected, along with selected players, chosen by a screening committee, whose last appearance was in 1988. All 10-year members of the BBWAA were eligible to vote.

Voters were instructed to cast votes for up to 10 candidates; any candidate receiving votes on at least 75% of the ballots would be honored with induction to the Hall. The ballot consisted of 38 players; a total of 456 ballots were cast, with 342 votes required for election. A total of 2,884 individual votes were cast, an average of 6.32 per ballot. Those candidates receiving less than 5% of the vote will not appear on future BBWAA ballots, but may eventually be considered by the Veterans Committee.

Candidates who were eligible for the first time are indicated here with a dagger (†). The one candidate who received at least 75% of the vote and was elected is indicated in bold italics; candidates who have since been elected in subsequent elections are indicated in italics. The 14 candidates who received less than 5% of the vote, thus becoming ineligible for future BBWAA consideration, are indicated with an asterisk (*).

Orlando Cepeda and Ken Boyer were on the ballot for the 15th and final time.

The newly eligible players included 26 All-Stars, eight of whom were not included on the ballot, representing a total of 86 All-Star selections. Among the new candidates were 10-time All-Star Steve Carlton, 9-time All-Star Dave Concepción, 8-time All-Star Ted Simmons, and 6-time All-Stars Graig Nettles and Bruce Sutter. The field included MVP (Don Baylor), three Cy Young Award winners (Sutter, Ron Guidry, and Carlton, who won four times), and two Rookies of the Year (Chris Chambliss and Bob Horner).

Players eligible for the first time who were not included on the ballot were: Bill Almon, Joaquín Andújar, Juan Beníquez, Ron Davis, Iván DeJesús, Gene Garber, Steve Henderson, Larry Herndon, Steve Kemp, Tippy Martinez, Donnie Moore, Jim Morrison, Jerry Mumphrey, Gary Roenicke, Jerry Royster, Lary Sorensen, Willie Upshaw, and Butch Wynegar.

J. G. Taylor Spink Award 
Wendell Smith (1914–1972) received the J. G. Taylor Spink Award honoring a baseball writer. The award was voted at the December 1993 meeting of the BBWAA, and included in the summer 1994 ceremonies.

References

External links
1994 Election at www.baseballhalloffame.org.

Baseball Hall of Fame balloting
Hall of Fame balloting